Dharmawati is a river located in the Bihar state of India. It floows over the Districts of Rohtas and Kaimur. Its mouth is located one Karmanasa River near to the village name as Panjrawan in Kaimur.

References 

Rivers of Bihar